The Kuban-Black Sea Soviet Republic (May 30 – July 6, 1918) was a short-lived republic of the Russian SFSR. Its capital was Yekaterinodar, now known as Krasnodar.

It was created by merging the Black Sea Soviet Republic and Kuban Soviet Republic. Later, it was itself merged into the North Caucasian Soviet Republic. The leader of the republic was Avran Rubin.

Subdivisions of the Russian Soviet Federative Socialist Republic
History of Kuban
Early Soviet republics
Post–Russian Empire states
States and territories established in 1918
Former socialist republics
Russian-speaking countries and territories